Uri Magbo (born 12 September 1987) is an Israeli footballer who currently plays for Sektzia Ness Ziona.

Early life
Magbo was born in Tel Aviv District, Israel. His father is African-American of Nigerian descent, whereas his mother is Jewish-Israeli and of Persian-Jewish descent.

Career
Magbo was brought up through the ranks of Maccabi Jaffa and joined the club's senior squad, which played under the name A.S. Ramat Eliyahu in 2006. In 2008, the club merged again, with Hapoel Ihud Tzeirei Jaffa, to form F.C. Bnei Jaffa, where Magbo played until he was loaned in mid-season to Liga Artzit club Hapoel Rishon LeZion, which was made a permanent transfer at the end of the season. In 2010, Magbo transferred to Premier League side F.C. Ashdod, where he made his Premier League debut on 28 August 2010, against Ironi Kiryat Shmona, coming on as a substitute. The following season, Magbo was loaned to Liga Leumit club Hapoel Ashkelon,  and at the end of the season, moved to another Liga Leumit club, Hakoah Amidar Ramat Gan. Magbo spent the next three seasons in Liga Leumit, and in 2015 was bought by Beitar Jerusalem, with which he played his first matches in European competitions. On 24 September 2019 Uri Magbo scored his first goal as Beitar Jerusalem player, while winning Toto Cup Al.

Honours

Team

Beitar Jerusalem
2019–20 Toto Cup Al : 24 September 2019

External links

References

1987 births
Living people
Israeli footballers
Maccabi Jaffa F.C. players
Bnei Jaffa F.C. players
Hapoel Rishon LeZion F.C. players
F.C. Ashdod players
Hapoel Ashkelon F.C. players
Hakoah Maccabi Amidar Ramat Gan F.C. players
Beitar Tel Aviv Bat Yam F.C. players
Beitar Jerusalem F.C. players
Maccabi Petah Tikva F.C. players
Hapoel Ironi Kiryat Shmona F.C. players
Hapoel Kfar Saba F.C. players
Sektzia Ness Ziona F.C. players
Liga Leumit players
Israeli Premier League players
Footballers from Jaffa
Footballers from Bat Yam
Association football defenders
Israeli people of Iranian-Jewish descent
Israeli people of African-American descent
Israeli people of Nigerian descent